Galectin-1 is a protein that in humans is encoded by the LGALS1 gene.

Gene and protein 

LGALS1 contains four exons. The galectin-1 protein is 135 amino acids in length and highly conserved across species. It can be found in the nucleus, the cytoplasm, the cell surface and in the extracellular space. Galectins in general lack a traditional signal sequence, but are still secreted across the plasma membrane. This non-traditional secretion requires a functional glycan binding site. Galectin 1 contains a single carbohydrate recognition domain through which it can bind glycans both as a monomer and as a homodimer. Dimers are non-covalently bound and will spontaneously disassociate in low concentration. Galectin 1 does not bind glycans when oxidized. Having 6 cysteine residues, the oxidation state has a significant effect on the protein structure. The oxidized form is reported to have alternative functions not involving carbohydrate binding.

Function 

The galectins are a family of beta-galactoside-binding proteins implicated in modulating cell-cell and cell-matrix interactions. Galectin-1 may act as an autocrine negative growth factor that regulates cell proliferation. Galectin-1 expression in Hodgkin Lymphoma has also been shown to mediate immunosuppression of CD8+ T-cells.

It has been linked to the inflammatory process in HIV individuals, and some research suggest that Gal-1 could be related to the HIV-1 latency.

Role in pregnancy

Galectin-1 is thought to play a role in creating immune tolerance in pregnancy. Galectin-1 is expressed by the endometrial stromal cells throughout the menstrual cycle, however significantly increases during implantation. Galectin-1 induces the differentiation of Dendritic cells towards a phenotype which dampens T helper 1 cells and T helper 17 cells and dampens inflammation via interleukin-10 and interleukin-27. It also plays a role in the formation and expression of HLA-G in the syncytium.

Interactions 

LGALS1 has been shown to interact with GEMIN4 HRAS.

See also 
Galectin

References

Further reading